The Mothman Prophecies is a 1975 book by John Keel.

Synopsis
The book relates Keel's accounts of his investigation into confirmed sightings of a large, winged creature called Mothman in the vicinity of Point Pleasant, West Virginia, during 1966 and 1967.  It combines these accounts with his theories about UFOs and various supernatural phenomena, ultimately connecting them to the collapse of the Silver Bridge across the Ohio River on December 15, 1967. Official investigations in 1971 determined it was caused by stress corrosion cracking in an eyebar in a suspension chain.

Reception
In the May/June 2002 issue of Skeptical Inquirer, journalist John C. Sherwood, a former business associate of UFO researcher Gray Barker, published an analysis of private letters between Keel and Barker during the period of Keel's investigation. In the article, "Gray Barker's Book of Bunk," Sherwood reported finding significant differences between what Keel wrote at the time of his investigation and what he wrote in his first book about the Mothman reports, raising questions about the book's accuracy. Sherwood also reported that Keel, who was well known for writing humorous and outrageous letters to friends and associates, would not assist him in clarifying the differences.

Film

The Mothman Prophecies was the inspiration for the 2002 film of the same name, starring Richard Gere.

References

External links 
 Invasion of the Doll People by Colin Bennett, in Fortean Times 156 (2002)
 

1975 non-fiction books
Non-fiction books adapted into films
Books about extraterrestrial life
Mothman
Paranormal
Point Pleasant, West Virginia
1967 in West Virginia
Saturday Review Press books